Goat Cay may refer to:

Goat Cay, Berry Islands, the Bahamas
Goat Cay, Exuma, the Bahamas